The Eleventh Amendment of the Constitution Act 1992 (previously bill no. 12 of 1992) is an amendment to the Constitution of Ireland permitted the state to ratify the Treaty on European Union, commonly known as the Maastricht Treaty. It was approved by referendum on 18 June 1992 and signed into law on 16 July of the same year.

Overview

The Eleventh Amendment of the Constitution was one of a number of amendments that have been made to expressly permit the state to ratify changes to the founding treaties of the European Union (then known as the European Community) (others have been the Tenth, Eighteenth, Twenty-sixth and the Twenty-eighth Amendments). These amendments were all adopted because of the finding of the Supreme Court in Crotty v. An Taoiseach (1987) that major changes to the treaties are unconstitutional unless accompanied by an amendment.

The Eleventh Amendment was introduced by a Fianna Fáil–Progressive Democrats coalition government and was also supported by opposition parties Fine Gael and the Labour Party. Democratic Left and the Green Party were opposed to it. Some anti-abortion groups also opposed the treaty, arguing that it might lead to legalised abortion in Ireland.

Changes to the text
The Eleventh Amendment amended Article 29.4 by the deletion of the highlighted sentence from subsection 3º:

and by the addition of the following subsections:

Result

See also
Third Amendment of the Constitution of Ireland (Membership of the European Communities)
Politics of the Republic of Ireland
History of the Republic of Ireland
Constitutional amendment

References

External links
Eleventh Amendment of the Constitution Act 1992
Eleventh Amendment of the Constitution Bill 1992
Referendum Act 1992
Full text of the Constitution of Ireland

1992 in international relations
1992 in Irish law
1992 in Irish politics
1992 referendums
11
Ireland Amendments of the Constitution
11
Ireland, 11
June 1992 events in Europe
Amendment, 11
Treaty on European Union